The House of God is a 1984 American comedy-drama film written and directed by Donald Wrye and starring Tim Matheson, Charles Haid, Michael Sacks, Ossie Davis and Howard Rollins.  It is based on Samuel Shem's novel of the same name.  According to Leonard Maltin, the film was never released theatrically.

Cast
Tim Matheson as Roy Basch
Charles Haid as Fats (The Fatman)
Bess Armstrong as Cissy Anderson
Michael Sacks as Wayne Potts
Lisa Pelikan as Jo Miller
George Coe as Dr. Leggo
Ossie Davis as Dr. Sanders
Howard Rollins as Chuck Johnston
James Cromwell as Officer Quick
Sandra Bernhard as Angel Dutton
Leo Burmester as Dr. Gath
Charles Fleischer as Hyper Hooper
Joe Piscopo as Dr. Fishberg
Michael Richards as Dr. Pinkus
Gilbert Gottfried as Paramedic
Lenny Schultz as Zeiss

Reception
Leonard Maltin awarded the film one and a half stars.

References

External links
 

American comedy-drama films
Films based on American novels
United Artists films
Films scored by Basil Poledouris
Films directed by Donald Wrye
1980s English-language films
Unreleased American films
1980s American films